HMS Coquette was a two funnel, 30-knot destroyer ordered by the Royal Navy under the 1896 – 1897 Naval Estimates. She was the fifth ship to carry this name. She was launched in 1897, served in home waters before World War I, and as a tender to the gunnery school at Sheerness during the war. She was sold for breaking in 1920.

Construction
She was laid down as yard number 319 on 8 June 1896 at the John I Thornycroft and Company shipyard at Chiswick on the River Thames. She was launched on 25 November 1897. She was completed and accepted by the Royal Navy in January 1899. During her acceptance trials and work ups her average sea speed was 25 knots.

Service history

Early service
After commissioning she was assigned to the Chatham Division of the Harwich Flotilla, and from 1899 she was part of the Medway Instructional Flotilla under the command of Lieutenant Charles Pipon Beaty-Pownall.

Commander Michael Culme-Seymour was appointed in command on 31 August 1900. In May 1902 she served in the Mediterranean, and was involved in a collision with the destroyer , when she had her bows stove in. Commander Sir Douglas Egremont Robert Brownrigg was appointed in command after he arrived at Malta in late September 1902.

On 30 August 1912 the Admiralty directed all destroyer classes were to be designated by alpha characters starting with the letter 'A'. Since her design speed was 30 knots and she had two funnels she was assigned to the D class. After 30 September 1913, she was known as a D-class destroyer and had the letter "D" painted on the hull below the bridge area and on either the fore or aft funnel.

World War I
August 1914 found her in active commission at The Nore Local Flotilla based at Sheerness tendered to HMS Actaeon, the gunnery school. She remained in this deployment for the duration of the First World War until her loss.

Loss
She was lost on 7 March 1916 at the entrance to Black Deep off the East Coast near Harwich after striking a mine laid by the German submarine .

Pennant numbers

References

Bibliography
 
 
 
 
 
 
 
 
 
 

 

Ships built in Chiswick
1897 ships
D-class destroyers (1913)
Maritime incidents in 1916
Ships sunk by mines
World War I shipwrecks in the North Sea
Ships built by John I. Thornycroft & Company